Rodney J. McKinley (born January 17, 1956) is a retired airman of the United States Air Force who served as the 15th Chief Master Sergeant of the Air Force from 2006 to 2009.

Military career
McKinley grew up in Mt. Orab, Ohio, graduating from Western Brown High School in 1974. He originally entered the United States Air Force in 1974, took a break in service in 1977 to attend college, and re-entered the Air Force in 1982. His background includes various duties in medical and aircraft maintenance, and as a first sergeant and Command Chief Master Sergeant at wing, numbered air force and major command levels. His assignments include bases in North Carolina, South Carolina, Oklahoma, Virginia, Alaska, and Hawaii. He also served overseas in the Philippines, Italy and Germany, and deployed to Southwest Asia in support of operations Enduring Freedom and Iraqi Freedom.

McKinley served as Command Chief Master Sergeant of the Pacific Air Forces at Hickam Air Force Base in Hawaii. He was appointed to the position of Chief Master Sergeant of the Air Force on June 30, 2006. In this post, McKinley represented the highest enlisted level of leadership and, as such, provided direction for the enlisted corps and represents their interests, as appropriate, to the American public, and to those in all levels of government. He served as the personal adviser to the chief of staff and the secretary of the Air Force on all issues regarding the welfare, readiness, morale, and proper utilization and progress of the enlisted force.

Post-military career
McKinley retired from the United States Air Force in June 2009, having served for over 30 years. From then to November 2012, he was senior vice president for strategic partnerships at MicroTech, a privately held information technology services company. Since January 2017, he has served on the Defense Advisory Committee on Investigations, Prosecution, and Defense of Sexual Assault in the US Department of Defense.

Education

Assignments
July 1974 – August 1974, student, basic military training, Lackland AFB, Texas
August 1974 – November 1974, medical service specialist technical training, Sheppard AFB, Texas
November 1974 – August 1977, emergency room technician, Seymour Johnson AFB, NC
August 1977 – April 1982, separated from the Air Force
April 1982 – June 1982, aircraft maintenance technology technical training, Sheppard AFB, Texas
June 1982 – June 1987, phase dock inspector, maintenance instructor, quality assurance inspector, noncommissioned officer in charge of aircraft weight and balance and functional check flights, 354th Tactical Fighter Wing, Myrtle Beach AFB, SC
June 1987 – June 1991, dedicated crew chief, quality assurance inspector, noncommissioned officer in charge aircraft weight and balance and functional check flights, chief inspector of quality assurance, 3rd Tactical Fighter Wing, Clark Air Base, Philippines
June 1991 – June 1992, First Sergeant, 354th Communications and Services squadrons, Myrtle Beach AFB, SC
June 1992 – January 1994, First Sergeant, 401st Munitions Support Squadron, Ghedi AB, Italy
January 1994 – July 2000, First Sergeant, 3rd Combat Communications Support Squadron, 965th Airborne Air Control Squadron, 552nd Equipment Maintenance Squadron, and 552nd Aircraft Generation Squadron, Tinker AFB, OK
July 2000 – July 2001, First Sergeant, 723rd Air Mobility Squadron, Ramstein AB, Germany
August 2001 – September 2002, Command Chief Master Sergeant, 86th Airlift Wing, Ramstein AB, Germany
September 2002 – June 2004, Command Chief Master Sergeant, 1st Fighter Wing, Langley AFB, VA (February 2003 – June 2003, Command Chief Master Sergeant, 379th Air Expeditionary Wing, Southwest Asia)
June 2004 – March 2005, Command Chief Master Sergeant, 11th Air Force, Elmendorf AFB, AK
March 2005 – June 2006, Command Chief Master Sergeant, Pacific Air Forces, Hickam AFB, HI
June 2006 – June 2009, Chief Master Sergeant of the Air Force, The Pentagon, Washington, D.C.

Awards and decorations

Other achievements

References

Living people
People from Georgetown, Ohio
Community College of the Air Force alumni
Saint Leo University alumni
University of Oklahoma alumni
Chief Master Sergeants of the United States Air Force
1956 births
Recipients of the Air Force Distinguished Service Medal
Recipients of the Legion of Merit
Recipients of the Meritorious Service Medal (United States)